Kalme may refer to:

Places in Estonia
Kalme, Harju County, village in Kuusalu Parish, Harju County
Kalme, Jõgeva County, village in Põltsamaa Parish, Jõgeva County
Kalme, Tartu County, village in Elva Parish, Tartu County
Kalme, Valga County, village in Tõrva Parish, Valga County

Other
Charles Kalme (1939–2002), American chess player and mathematician